William of Sicily may refer to:
 William I of Sicily, the second king of Sicily (1131-1166).
 William II of Sicily, the third king of Sicily (1155 - 1189).
 William III of Sicily, king of Sicily (1190–1198).